Xirolimni is a community of the city of Kozani in northern Greece. Located west of the city centre, it has a population of 388 (2011).

The village was named Şahinler (Eng. "buzzards") by Ottoman Turk inhabitants until the 1924 population exchange between Greece and Turkey.

References

Kozani
Populated places in Kozani (regional unit)